Yushan is a hill located in the northwest of Changshu in Jiangsu Province, China. It is named after Yu Zhong, a government official who was buried in the hill during the Shang and Zhou dynasty. Yushan is 300 meters high and 6.5 kilometers long. It looks like a sleeping cow. Yushan is known for "Eighteen Scenery".

Scenery
The Snow on Book Set()
Broken Hill Morning()
Xin Feng Morning()
Kun Cheng Twin Towers()
Taoyuan Spring()
Wei Mo Sun Rising()
Jianmen Kistler()
Blowing Water()
Qin Po Waterfall()
Ou Qu Fishing()
Fu Gang Tide()
West Pavilion()
Puren Autumn()
Star Altar Seven Juniper()
Lake Rain()
Lake Moon()
Wu Gu Maple Valley()
Three Peak Green Pine()

Yushan Park
Yushan Park is located on the banks of Yangcheng Lake, Changshu. In 1982, it was listed as a national key scenic area – one of the most famous scenic areas within the Lake Tai scenic area. In 1989, Yushan Park was approved as a National Forest Park by the Ministry of Forestry.

Scenery
Xingfu()
Jianmen()
Baoyan Ecological Sightseeing Garden()
Xinfeng()
City Wall Ruins()

See also
Yanzi's Tomb, located on Yushan

References

Mountains of Suzhou
Changshu
Landforms of Jiangsu
Hills of China